Blacksboat railway station served the village of Ballindalloch, Banffshire, Scotland from 1863 to 1965 on the Strathspey Railway.

History 
The station opened on 1 July 1863 by the Strathspey Railway. It had a rectangular shaped building and a wooden goods shed. The station closed to both passengers and goods traffic on 18 October 1965.

References 

Disused railway stations in Moray
Railway stations in Great Britain opened in 1863
Railway stations in Great Britain closed in 1965
Beeching closures in Scotland
1863 establishments in Scotland
1965 disestablishments in Scotland
Former Great North of Scotland Railway stations